The simple station Suba Calle 100 is part of the TransMilenio mass-transit system of Bogotá, Colombia, which opened in the year 2000.

Location 
The station is located in northwestern Bogotá, specifically on Avenida Suba with Calle 100.

It serves the Andes, Andes Norte, Ilarco, and Pasadena neighborhoods.

Nearby is the Iserra 100 shopping center.

History 

In 2006, phase two of the TransMilenio system was completed, including the Avenida Suba line, on which this station is located.

The station is named Suba Calle 100 due to its location on the north side of the intersection of Avenida Suba with Avenida Calle 100(100th. Street) (or Avenida España).

Station services

Main line service

Dual services

Feeder routes 
This station does not have connections to feeder routes.

Inter-city service 

This station does not have inter-city service.

External links 
 TransMilenio

See also 
 Bogotá
 TransMilenio
 List of TransMilenio Stations

TransMilenio
Suba